Friendly Hills may refer to:

Friendly Hills, Whittier, California
Friendly Hills, San Bernardino County, California
Friendly Hills (Tryon, North Carolina), listed on the NRHP in North Carolina